The 2007 Dutch Open Tennis Amersfoort was the 48th edition of the Dutch Open tennis tournament and was played on outdoor clay courts. The tournament was held from 16 July until 23 July 2007 in Amersfoort, the Netherlands and was part of the International series of the 2007 ATP Tour.

Steve Darcis won his first career title, as a qualifier ranked 297th.

Finals

Singles

 Steve Darcis defeated  Werner Eschauer, 6–1, 7–6(7–1)

Doubles

 Juan Pablo Brzezicki /  Juan Pablo Guzmán defeated  Robin Haase /  Rogier Wassen, 6–2, 6–0

References

External links
ITF – Amersfoort tournament edition details
Singles draw
Doubles draw
Qualifying Singles draw